This is a chronological list of Pakistan Test wicket-keepers.

Pakistani wicket keeping has been stable over the years, with Pakistani selectors often unwilling to rotate players. As a result, several of these players have ended up captaining Pakistani sides in part because of their longevity in the team, such as Wasim Bari, Imtiaz Ahmed, Moin Khan and Sarfraz Ahmed. Wasim Bari is the longest-serving wicketkeeper for Pakistan.

Anil Dalpat is the only non-Muslim wicket-keeper who represented Pakistan.

References

 Pakistan Test wicket-keepers

Wicket-keepers, Test
Pakistani
Pakistani
Wicket-keepers